Ansud (also read as Ianupu, Yanup, Anubu, Gansud, Anusu and Hanusum), was an early king (Lugal) of the second Mariote kingdom who reigned c. 2423-2416 BC. Ansud is known for warring against the Eblaites from a letter written by the later Mariote king Enna-Dagan.

Reign

Identity
It has been proposed that a bead (reference M. 4439) discovered at Mari, was sent as a gift by Mesannepada of Ur to king "Hanusum" (Gansud) of Mari. This has now been corrected with new translations only giving Mesannepada as son of Meskalamdug:

 
It is unclear how this bead came to be in Mari, but this points to some kind of relation between Ur and Mari at that time. The bead was discovered in a jar containing other objects from Ur or Kish.

The letter of Enna-Dagan is extremely difficult to read, and the word "Sa'umu" appeared in three passages of it. In the second and third passages, the word referred to Ansud's successor Sa'umu. However, in the first passage, "Sa'umu" was read as a verb by Giovanni Pettinato, who later read it as (Anudu). Alfonso Archi, recognized that this verb is a personal name of a monarch and read it as Anubu (motivated by the Sumerian King List which record a dynasty of Mari and king Anbu as the first monarch of the dynasty). However, the discovery of an intact (SKL) with the names of Mari's dynasty bearing no resemblance to second kingdom monarchs, eliminated the need for Archi's identification. According to Michael Astour, the name is Anusu (Ansud) and must be correlated with king Hanusum.

Campaigns
In the letter Ansud is recorded defeating the Eblaite vassal cities of Aburu, Ilgi and Belan. The king is also mentioned leaving ruins in the mountains of Labanan, which were identified by Pettinato with Lebanon. However, this identification was ruled as geographically impossible by Astour.

See also
Eblaite-Mariote war

Notes

Citations

25th-century BC rulers
Kings of Mari
25th-century BC people